Radiomonitor Türkiye, previously known as MusicTopTR, is the official Turkish airplay chart composed exclusively of Turkish language singles in Turkey. The official chart was initially issued by Nielsen Music Control under the name Türkçe Top 20 but is now provided by Radiomonitor.

The chart was previously announced from the Nielsen's website weekly. Billboard Türkiye magazine also used Nielsen data for their single charts. Billboard has continued to publish Turkey Songs chart, which exclusively list trending Turkish-language songs weekly.

Lists of number-one songs

Artists and songs with the most weeks at number one

References 

 Nielsen Music Control for the current No. 1 song, previous number ones may be found via archive.org

Turkish record charts
Turkish music